María Laura Aladro (born 17 January 1983) is an Argentine field hockey player who plays as a goalkeeper.

She won the 2010 World Cup with the Argentina national team. Laura also won three Champions Trophy (2009, 2010, 2014), the World League 2014–15 and the Pan American Cup in 2009.

References

1983 births
Living people
Las Leonas players
Argentine female field hockey players
Female field hockey goalkeepers
Field hockey players at the 2011 Pan American Games
People from Tandil
Sportspeople from Buenos Aires Province
Pan American Games silver medalists for Argentina
Pan American Games medalists in field hockey
Medalists at the 2011 Pan American Games
20th-century Argentine women
21st-century Argentine women